MDN1, midasin homolog (yeast) is a protein that in humans is encoded by the MDN1 gene. Midasin is a member AAA ATPase family.

Model organisms

Model organisms have been used in the study of MDN1 function. A conditional knockout mouse line, called Mdn1tm1a(KOMP)Wtsi was generated as part of the International Knockout Mouse Consortium program — a high-throughput mutagenesis project to generate and distribute animal models of disease to interested scientists.

Male and female animals underwent a standardized phenotypic screen to determine the effects of deletion. Twenty four tests were carried out on mutant mice and three significant abnormalities were observed.  No homozygous mutant embryos were identified during gestation, and therefore none survived until weaning. The remaining tests were carried out on heterozygous mutant adult mice; females had an increased susceptibility to bacterial infection.

References

Further reading 
 

Genes mutated in mice